The current flag of Georgia was adopted on February 19, 2003. The flag bears three horizontal stripes (a red-white-red triband) and features a blue canton containing a ring of 13 white stars that encircle the state's gold-colored coat of arms. The ring of stars that encompass the state's coat of arms represents Georgia as one of the original Thirteen Colonies.

In the coat of arms, the arch symbolizes the state's constitution while the pillars represent the three branches of government. The words of the state motto, "Wisdom, Justice, and Moderation", are wrapped around the pillars, guarded by a male figure dressed in colonial attire from the American Revolutionary War. Within the arms, a sword is drawn to represent the defense of the state's constitution with the motto of the United States, "In God We Trust", featured below these elements. 

The overall design is based on the First National Flag of the Confederacy, which was nicknamed the "Stars and Bars". Since Mississippi's vote to change their flag design in 2020, the Georgia flag remains one of the few state flags with references to the Confederacy. It is one of three U.S. state flags to feature the words "In God We Trust", with the other two being those of Florida and Mississippi.

Origins 
The Georgia Code of 1861 required that militia regiments and battalions detailed for service outside of Georgia be provided with regimental colors "bearing the arms of the State". Regimental colors were to be inscribed with name of the unit. The color of the flag itself was not specified. A surviving state flag in the collection of the American Civil War Museum in Richmond, however, places the arms on a red field.

History

First flag (1879–1956) 

The 1879 flag was introduced by Georgia state senator Herman H. Perry and was adopted to memorialize Confederate soldiers during the American Civil War. Perry was a former colonel in the Confederate army during the war, and he presumably based the design on the First National Flag of the Confederacy, commonly known as the Stars and Bars.  Over the years the flag was changed by adding and altering a charge on the vertical blue band at the hoist. The original 1879 design featured a solid blue band with no additional emblems.

A 1902 amendment to the state militia laws added the state's coat of arms to the blue band, though a 2000 research report by the Georgia Senate states that researchers were not aware of any surviving flags depicting the coat of arms directly on the blue band, suggesting that no such flag was ever actually produced. Instead, no later than 1904, the coat of arms began to be depicted on a white shield, possibly with a gold outline. This version also added a red ribbon with the word "GEORGIA" below the shield. Examples of this modified version were discovered by the Senate researchers.

Some flag manufacturers included the year 1799 in the coat of arms, as in the state seal; the seal had been adopted in that year. In 1914, the General Assembly changed the year to 1776, the year the United States Declaration of Independence was signed.

At some point, the coat of arms began to be replaced with the state seal. The Senate report indicates this happened sometime in the 1910s or 1920s, and may have been connected to the 1914 change in the state seal's date and the need to conform newly produced flags to that change. The report notes that the first official state publication to use the seal instead of the coat of arms was the 1927 Georgia Official Register, which used a color version of the seal, adding that various versions of the seal were used on flags during this era, until a new drawing was prescribed in the 1950s.

Second flag (1956–2001) 

In early 1955, chairman of the State Democratic Party and attorney for the Association County Commissioners of Georgia John Sammons Bell (who later served as a judge on the Georgia Court of Appeals) suggested a new state flag for Georgia that would incorporate the Confederate Battle Flag. At the 1956 session of the General Assembly, state senators Jefferson Lee Davis and Willis Harden introduced Senate Bill 98 to change the state flag. Signed into law on February 13, 1956, the bill became effective the following July 1.

A copy of the new flag displayed at the 1956 signing ceremony shows slight differences from the state flag commonly produced (and shown here). In the 1956 version, the stars are larger, and only the center point of the central star points straight up. Also, the first copies of the 1956 flag used a different version of the state seal. (The 1920 Georgia State Seal was the state seal seen on these early examples. This is the seal seen on all later 1920 Design Georgia State Flags.) In the summer of 1954, a new redrawn state seal began to appear on state government documents. By the end of the decade, flag makers were using the new seal on Georgia's official state flags.
 
The 1956 flag was adopted in an era when the Georgia General Assembly "was entirely devoted to passing legislation that would preserve segregation and white supremacy", according to a 2000 research report by the Georgia Senate. There are few, if any, written records of what was said on the Georgia House and Senate floors when the 1956 flag bill was being introduced and passed by the Georgia legislature, nor does Georgia law provide for a statement of legislative intent when a bill is introduced, although former U.S. congressman James Mackay, one of the 32 House members who opposed the change, later stated, "There was only one reason for putting the flag on there: like the gun rack in the back of a pickup truck, it telegraphs a message." Additionally, the 2000 report concluded that the "1956 General Assembly changed the state flag" during "an atmosphere of preserving segregation and resentment" to the U.S. government's rulings on integration. The changed flag was seen as a "gesture of defiance in the face of the federal government's initial enforcement of Brown vs. Board of Education (1954)".

The 2000 report states that the people who had supported the flag's change in the 1950s said, in recalling the event years later, that "the change was made in preparation for the Civil War centennial, which was five years away; or that the change was made to commemorate and pay tribute to the Confederate veterans of the Civil War." Bell, who designed the 1956 flag and supported its adoption during the 1950s as a defense of the state's "institutions", which at the time included segregation, claimed years later that he did so to honor Confederate soldiers. The 2000 report states that the claims that the flag was ostensibly changed in 1956 to honor Confederate soldiers came much later after the flag's adoption, in an attempt by the change's supporters to backtrack from prior support of segregation in an era where it was no longer fashionable, saying that the "argument that the flag was changed in 1956 in preparation for the approaching Civil War centennial appears to be a retrospective or after-the-fact argument" and that "no one in 1956, including the flag’s sponsors, claimed that the change was in anticipation of the coming anniversary".

At the time, opposition to changing the flag came from various sides, including from Confederate historical groups like the United Daughters of the Confederacy (UDC). Opponents to a change of the flag stated that incorporating the Confederate battle flag into the design would be too sectionalist, counterproductive, and divisive, saying that people should show patriotism towards the United States rather than the defunct Confederacy, referring to the U.S. Pledge of Allegiance, which states that the U.S. is "one nation ... indivisible". Opponents of the flag's change also said that there was nothing wrong with the 1920 flag and that people were content with it. Others opposed changing the flag out of the burden it would place on those who would have to purchase a new flag to replace the outdated one.

The 2000 Georgia senate report and other critics have interpreted the adoption of the 1956 flag as a symbol of racist protest, citing legislation passed in 1956 which included bills rejecting Brown v. Board of Education and pro-segregationist comments by then-Governor Marvin Griffin, such as "The rest of the nation is looking to Georgia for the lead in segregation." Although legislators openly supported segregation, no written record exists of what was said in Senate and House sessions concerning the reason for the flag change.

Political pressure for a change in the official state flag increased during the 1990s, in particular during the run-up to the 1996 Olympic Games that were held in Atlanta. The National Association for the Advancement of Colored People (NAACP) focused on the Georgia flag as a major issue and some business leaders in Georgia felt that the perceptions of the flag were causing economic harm to the state. In 1992, Governor Zell Miller announced his intention to get the Confederate element removed, but the state legislature refused to pass any flag-modifying legislation. The matter was dropped after the 1993 legislative session. Many Atlanta residents and some Georgia politicians refused to fly the 1956 flag and flew the pre-1956 flag instead.

Third flag (2001–2003) 

Miller's successor as governor, Roy Barnes, responded to the increasing calls for a new state flag, and in 2001 hurried a replacement through the Georgia General Assembly. His new flag, designed by architect Cecil Alexander, sought a compromise, by featuring small versions of some (but not all) of Georgia's former flags, including the controversial 1956 flag, under the words "Georgia's History".  Those flags are a thirteen-star U.S. flag of the "Betsy Ross" design; the first Georgia flag (before 1879); the 1920–1956 Georgia flag; the previous state flag (1956–2001); and the current fifty-star U.S. flag.

In a 2001 survey on state and provincial flags in North America conducted by the North American Vexillological Association, the redesigned Georgia flag was ranked the worst by a wide margin.  The group stated that the flag "violates all the principles of good flag design".  After the 1956 state flag was replaced in 2001, the Georgia city of Trenton adopted a modified version as its official city flag, to protest its discontinuation.

There was widespread opposition to the new flag, deemed the "Barnes rag". It led, according to Barnes himself, to his defeat for reelection two years later; the flag was a major issue in the election.

Fourth flag (2003–present) 

In 2002, Sonny Perdue was elected Governor of Georgia, partially on a platform of allowing Georgians to choose their own flag in a state referendum. He authorized the Georgia legislature to draft a new flag in 2003.

The Georgia General Assembly's proposed "compromise flag" is based on the First National Flag of the Confederacy, the Stars and Bars, which was less known than the Confederate battle flag, with a symbol based on the state's coat of arms and the words "In God We Trust" placed within the circle of stars. Perdue signed the legislation into law on February 19, 2003.

The 2003 flag legislation also authorized a referendum on which of the two most recent flags (the 2001 and 2003 versions) would be adopted as the flag of the state; the 1956 flag was not an option.  The referendum took place during the state's March 2, 2004 presidential primary election. If the 2003 flag was rejected, the pre-2001 design would have been put to a vote. The 2003 design won 73.1% of the vote in the referendum.

Pledge of Allegiance

See also  

 List of Georgia state symbols
 List of flags by design
 List of U.S. state, district, and territorial insignia

References

Further reading 
 Georgia Flags, Ben W. Fortson, Secretary of State, 1963.

External links 

State Flags of Georgia at New Georgia Encyclopedia

2003 establishments in Georgia (U.S. state)
Georgia
Georgia
Religion in the United States
Symbols of Georgia (U.S. state)
Georgia